Ryan Williams (born January 23, 1979) is a Canadian politician who was elected to represent the riding of Bay of Quinte in the House of Commons of Canada in the 2021 Canadian federal election.

Biography
Williams is the President of Williams Hotels, which operates a number of regional hotels. Prior to being elected to the House of Commons, he sat on Belleville City Council, but did not complete his term as he ran in the federal election. He is married and has three children.

Election results

References

External links

Living people
21st-century Canadian politicians
Conservative Party of Canada MPs
Members of the House of Commons of Canada from Ontario
Canadian hoteliers
Businesspeople from Ontario
Ontario municipal councillors
Politicians from Belleville, Ontario
1979 births